Thomas Lærke (born 4 April 1991) is a Danish professional basketball player. He is currently playing for CB Morón in Spain's LEB Plata.

He was a member of the Danish national basketball team and participated at the 2015 EuroBasket qualification.

Professional career
Lærke started his professional career in 2011 in Spain with Huesca of the LEB Oro.

In 2013, Lærke returned to Denmark by signing with Bakken Bears. With the Bears, he won two national championships and two national cups over a four year span.

On 7 July 2017, he signed with BC Nokia of the Finnish Korisliiga. In December 2017, Lærke returned to Bakken Bears. He parted company with the Bears at the conclusion of the 2021-22 season after winning a total of seven national championships with the team. In 2018, 2020 and 2022, he reached the semifinal of the FIBA Europe Cup with the Bakken side.

Lærke continued his career abroad, signing with the VfL Kirchheim Knights of the German second-tier league ProA in late September 2022. He saw action in three ProA contests, averaging 7.7 points a game. His short-term-contract was not renewed in October 2022. Subsequently, Lærke moved to Esgueira Basket of Portugal's first-tier league. On March 1st, 2023, he was signed by CB Morón of Spain's LEB Plata.

References

External links
Bakken Bears Profile
Eurobasket.com Profile

1991 births
Living people
Araberri BC players
Bakken Bears players
BC Nokia players
CB Peñas Huesca players
Danish expatriate basketball people in the United States
Danish expatriate basketball people in Spain
Danish men's basketball players
Point guards
Shooting guards
Sportspeople from Copenhagen